Sixty-nine or 69, also known by its French name soixante-neuf (69), is a group of sex positions in which two people align themselves so that each person's mouth is near the other's genitals, each simultaneously performing oral sex on the other. The participants are thus mutually inverted like the numerals 6 and 9 in the number 69, hence the name. This position can involve any combination of sexes.

Method
Variations of the 69 positions include mutual anilingus or "double rimming", and digital penetration of either partner's anus or vagina.

In these positions, the partners are said to experience sexual stimulation simultaneously, but this can also distract those who try to focus solely on pleasuring themselves. The position can also be awkward for partners who are not similar in height.

History
The term sixty-nine or soixante-neuf for mutual simultaneous oral-genital stimulation is an English translation of the euphemistic French term, "soixante-neuf."  The term "soixante-neuf" has not been traced any earlier than the Whore's Catechisms published in the 1790s in France, usually attributed to the early leader of the French Revolution, Mlle. Théroigne de Méricourt.

"The earliest unequivocal representation of the sixty-nine appears to be that on an oil-lamp preserved in the Munich Museum (Deutsches Museum), and first reproduced in Dr. Gaston Vorberg's ... portfolio, Die Erotik der Antiken in Kleinkunst und Keramik (Munich, 1921) plate 58, showing the woman lying on top of the man. Dr. Vorberg gives this ... to be of the period of the Roman Caesars ... . However, another oil-lamp of the same kind, showing the sixty-nine almost identically ... is more recently reproduced as a full-color plate, in Prof. Jean Marcadé's Eros Kalos (English-language edition, Geneva : Nagel, 1965), facing page 58, in ... lamps preserved in the Heracleion Museum in Greece."

"A Hindu temple-sculpture from the sacred caverns of the island of Elephanta, near Mumbai in India, showing this position with the man actually standing, and holding the woman hanging down in this from his shoulders, was ... brought to England in the late eighteenth century ... . ... this sculptured fragment ... is both discussed and illustrated in Richard Payne Knight's A Discourse on the Worship of Priapus, privately issued for the Dilettanti Society of London in 1786 ... . The illustration in question is a detail engraving given in Payne Knight's plate XI; and the full form of this sculptured group is ... given as plate XXIV."

The Kama Sutra mentions this sex position, albeit by a different name: "When a man and woman lie down in an inverted order, i.e. with the head of the one towards the feet of the other and carry on [mouth] congress, it is called the 'congress of a crow'."

Internet meme 
In reference to the sex position, "69" has become an internet meme, where users will respond to any occurrence of the number with the word "nice" and draw specific attention to it. This means to sarcastically imply that the reference to the sex position was intentional. Because of its association with the sex position and resulting meme, "69" has become known as "the sex number" in these communities, similar to the number 420, which is known as "the weed number".

See also
 Anilingus
 Cunnilingus
 Fellatio

Notes

References

 

Cunnilingus
Fellatio
Oral eroticism
Sex positions
Pornography terminology

sv:Oralsex#69:an